The 2019–20 CEV Champions League is the highest level of European club volleyball in the 2019–20 season and the 60th edition.

Qualification

A total of 20 teams will compete in the main competition, with 18 teams being allocated direct vacancies on the basis of ranking list for European Cup Competitions and 2 teams qualify from the qualification rounds.

Pool composition
Drawing of lots for the league round was held on 25 October 2019 in Sofia, Bulgaria.

League round

All times are local.

Pool A

|}

|}

Pool B

|}

|}

Pool C

|}

|}

Pool D

|}

|}

Pool E

|}

|}

Second place ranking

|}

Playoffs
 Drawing of Lots was held on 20 February 2020.
All times are local.

Quarterfinals

|}

First leg

|}

Second leg

|}
The matches between Fenerbahçe Opet Istanbul and Igor Gorgonzola Novara, Savino Del Bene Scandicci and Eczacıbaşı VitrA Istanbul have been postponed due to escalation of the COVID-19 pandemic in Europe.

Semifinals

|}

First leg

|}

Second leg

|}

Final

|}

References

External links
 Official Website

CEV Women's Champions League
2019 in women's volleyball
2020 in women's volleyball
CEV Women's Champions League